Patient Porky is a 1940 Warner Bros. Looney Tunes cartoon directed by Bob Clampett, written by Warren Foster, and scored by Carl W. Stalling. The short was released on August 24, 1940, and stars Porky Pig. Bugs Bunny's prototype makes a cameo appearance in this cartoon, making it his fifth and final appearance.

Plot

The cartoon begins with a tour of a hospital. Porky checks in with a stomach ache, caused by overeating at his birthday party. Instead of a real doctor, he encounters a crazy cat patient posing as "Dr. Chilled-Air" (a reference to Dr. Kildare). Porky explains that he has a stomach ache brought on by overeating at his birthday party. The cat says, "Well, let's take a look" and slams an X-Ray machine into him. The X-Ray shows a birthday cake with only one piece missing and candles still lit in Porky's stomach. The cat decides to take Porky on as his own patient. The cat escorts Porky over to a bed then throws onto a bed where Porky bounces up off of it. His clothes come off, and a gown that was lying on the bed flies into the air. Porky slips right into it and bounces onto the bed, and the covers go right over him. The cat rushes him off to the operating room where he intends on performing surgery on him. The cat is sharpening knives and polishing a huge saw with a rag. Then he uses an airbag as a punching bag. The cat strolls over to Porky with the saw in his hand, pulls down the covers, lifts Porky's gown, and brings the saw over to cut open Porkys belly. After Porky realizes what the cat's intentions are, he panics and exclaims "Hey! Wh-wh-wh-what's a big idea?!" and squirms around to escape from him while the cat still has his gown raised and continues to try to cut him open. Porky finally breaks free from the cat, dives under the bed, and crawls through the sheets in an attempt to get away. He runs out of the operating room, out of the hospital, and back to his house with the cat hot on his trail! Porky runs up the stairs, runs into his bedroom, and slams the door shut. The cat follows him and opens the door only to see Porky lying in his bed, smiling. Thinking Porky has given in and he has the upper hand, the cat runs over to Porky with a satisfied smile. The cat again pulls the covers down and lifts Porky's gown in another attempt to cut him open when he spots something on Porky's belly. It's a sticker that says "Do not open till Xmas." The cat, surprised looks at the camera and says "Christmas?" The cat jumps into bed right next to Porky with the saw at his side, smiles, and responds, "I'll wait", much to Porky's horror and dismay.

Home media
Patient Porky was released, uncut and restored, on Looney Tunes Golden Collection: Volume 5, Disc 3.

See also
 Looney Tunes and Merrie Melodies filmography (1940–1949)

References

External links
 
 

1940 films
1940 animated films
1940 short films
1940s animated short films
Looney Tunes shorts
Warner Bros. Cartoons animated short films
American black-and-white films
Films directed by Bob Clampett
Films set in hospitals
1940 comedy films
Bugs Bunny films
Porky Pig films
Films scored by Carl Stalling
Films produced by Leon Schlesinger
1940s Warner Bros. animated short films
1940s English-language films